Carlos Joaquín Correa (born 13 August 1994), nicknamed "El Tucu" (derived from his home province of Tucumán), is an Argentine professional footballer who plays as a forward for  club Inter Milan and the Argentina national team.

Club career

Estudiantes

Born in Juan Bautista Alberdi, Tucumán, Correa represented River Plate, Renato Cesarini and Estudiantes as a youth. He made his first team debut with the latter on 19 May 2012, coming on for Duván Zapata in a 0–3 away win against Banfield for the Primera División championship.

Correa scored his first professional goal on 10 May 2014, netting the first in a 3–0 home win against San Lorenzo. He also featured regularly for the side during the year's Copa Sudamericana, scoring in a 2–1 home win against Peñarol on 15 October.

Sampdoria
On 16 December 2014, Correa transferred to Serie A club Sampdoria for a US$10 million fee. He signed a four-and-a-half-year contract the following 9 January, receiving the number 8 shirt.

Correa made his debut for Samp on 15 February 2015, starting in a 1–2 loss at Chievo. Rarely used during his first season, he switched his number to 10 ahead of the 2015–16 campaign, and started to feature more regularly.

Correa scored his first goal abroad on 17 January 2016 in a 1–2 loss at Carpi. In the following two matchdays, he scored back-to-back goals against Napoli (2–4 home loss) and Bologna (2–3 away loss), and finished the season with three goals as his side achieved a disappointing 15th place.

Sevilla
On 10 July 2016, Spanish La Liga side Sevilla reached an agreement with Sampdoria for the transfer of Correa for a rumoured €13 million fee. Presented by the club two days later, he made his debut for the club on 17 August, starting in a 0–3 away loss against Barcelona for the second leg of the 2016 Supercopa de España.

Correa made his debut in the main category of Spanish football on 20 August 2016, replacing compatriot Luciano Vietto in a 6–4 home win against Espanyol. On 22 February 2017, he scored his first UEFA Champions League goal in a 2–1 win over Leicester City in the 2016–17 UEFA Champions League round of 16.

On 17 September 2017, he scored the equalizing goal in a 2–2 draw against Liverpool at Anfield in the 2017–18 UEFA Champions League. On 11 April 2018, he committed a horror challenge on Javi Martínez in added time against Bayern Munich in the quarter-finals of the 2017–18 UEFA Champions League season and was shown a straight red.

Lazio
On 1 August 2018, Correa returned to Italy to join Lazio on a five-year contract for a €16 million transfer fee. He made his debut for Lazio on 18 August, in a 1–2 home loss against Napoli. On 26 September 2018, he scored his first goal for Lazio in 2–1 home win against Udinese. In the 2018–19 Coppa Italia, Correa scored the goal that eliminated AC Milan from the competition and allowed Lazio to reach the final. In the final, Correa scored the second goal in a 2–0 win against Atalanta, winning the first trophy with Lazio. In his first season with Lazio, he made 44 appearances, scoring 9 goals.

On 10 October 2019, he extended his contract with Lazio until 2024. On 22 December 2019, he started in Lazio's 3–1 win in the 2019 Supercoppa Italiana, winning his second trophy with the club. In his second season, he made 35 appearances, scoring 10 goals.

In his third and last season with Lazio, he made 38 appearances, scoring 11 goals.

Inter Milan
On 26 August 2021, Correa joined Inter Milan on a year-long loan deal with an obligation to buy with three-year contract to take effect after the loan period. On 27 August, he made his league debut for Inter Milan in a 3–1 win over Verona where he came on as a substitute and scored twice.

International career
Correa made his senior international debut for Argentina on 9 June 2017, in a 1–0 win over rivals Brazil held in Melbourne. On 13 June, he scored his first international goal in a 6–0 away friendly win over Singapore. He was a part of the victorious Argentine squad at the 2021 Copa America making 3 appearances at the tournament. He was called up to the 26 man squad for the 2022 FIFA World Cup by manager Lionel Scaloni, but ultimately ended up missing the tournament due to an injury sustained 5 days before it started. He was replaced by Thiago Almada.

Style of play 
Correa is primarily deployed as a deep-lying forward or supporting striker, although he is also capable of functioning as a left winger, or as a centre-forward. Among his main strengths are his ball control, dribbling ability, pace, and agility. He has cited the Brazilian former attacking midfielder and playmaker Kaká as an inspiration.

Career statistics

Club

International

Scores and results list Argentina's goal tally first.

Honours 

Lazio
 Coppa Italia: 2018–19
 Supercoppa Italiana: 2019

Inter Milan
 Coppa Italia: 2021–22
 Supercoppa Italiana: 2021, 2022

Argentina
 Copa América: 2021
 CONMEBOL-UEFA Cup of Champions: 2022

References

External links

Profile at the Inter Milan website

1994 births
Living people
Argentine footballers
Argentine expatriate footballers
Sportspeople from Tucumán Province
Association football midfielders
Argentine Primera División players
Serie A players
La Liga players
Estudiantes de La Plata footballers
U.C. Sampdoria players
Sevilla FC players
S.S. Lazio players
Inter Milan players
Expatriate footballers in Italy
Argentine expatriate sportspeople in Italy
Expatriate footballers in Spain
Argentine expatriate sportspeople in Spain
2021 Copa América players
Copa América-winning players